Bagneux is a commune in the department of Aisne in the Hauts-de-France region of northern France.

Geography
Bagneux is located some 10 km north by northwest of Soissons and 25 km southeast of Noyon. It can be accessed by road D428 from Épagny in the west running east through the commune to Juvigny. The south and west of the commune are heavily forested slopes with the rest of the commune flat farmland.

Part of the southern border of the commune is formed by Le Plat Ru stream which joins the Ru de Mareuil which is the western border of the commune and continues west.

Neighbouring communes and villages

History
In the second round of the French presidential election of 2002 Bagneux had the fifteenth largest vote for Jean-Marie Le Pen in France. His score in the commune was 53.85% of the total vote.

Administration
List of Successive Mayors of Bagneux

Mayors from 1941

Population

Sites and monuments

The Church contains two items that are registered as historical objects:
A Group Sculpture: Saint Martin and the pauper (16th century)
A Baptismal font (destroyed) (13th century)

See also
Communes of the Aisne department

References

External links
Bagneux on the old IGN website 
40000 Bell Towers website  
Agglomeration Community of Soissonnais website 
Bagneux on Géoportail, National Geographic Institute (IGN) website 
Bagneux on the 1750 Cassini Map

Communes of Aisne